Paracosm is the second studio album by American singer Washed Out, released on August 7, 2013 by Sub Pop. It was produced by Washed Out and Ben H. Allen and was recorded at Maze Studios in Atlanta.

"It All Feels Right" was released as the album's lead single on June 11, 2013. Upon release, the album received mostly positive reviews from critics. The album debuted at number 21 on the Billboard 200, selling 13,000 copies in its first week.

Track listing

Personnel
Credits adapted from the liner notes of Paracosm.

 Ernest Greene – vocals ; production ; recording ; art direction
 Ben H. Allen – bass, guitar, percussion, production, synthesizer ; mixing, recording 
 Sasha Barr – design
 Sara Cywnar – floral collage
 Shae Detar – inside photo
 Bradley Hagen – drums
 Robby Handley – bass 
 Sumner Jones – recording 
 Jason Kingsland – mixing, recording 
 Jeff Kleinsmith – design
 Matt Stoessel – pedal steel guitar

Charts

Release history

References

2013 albums
Sub Pop albums
Washed Out albums
Albums produced by Ben H. Allen